stc Bahrain (previously VIVA Bahrain) is a telecommunications company based in Bahrain. It is owned by the Saudi Telecom Company (stc Group) and started its commercial service in March 2010. It is headquartered in Manama, Bahrain.

History 
On the January 23, 2009, the Telecommunications Regulatory Authority of Bahrain (TRA) announced that stc won the third mobile network operating license in a bid worth BD 86.7 Million (US$231 Million). STC established STC Bahrain in 2009 but renamed it to VIVA in January 2010. The company was renamed to stc Bahrain back again in December 2019.

See also
Telecommunications in Bahrain
Batelco

References

External links
 

Telecommunications companies of Bahrain
Telecommunications companies established in 2010
Bahraini companies established in 2010